Cenchrus spinifex, known commonly as the common sandbur, coastal sandbur, or stickerweed, is a perennial grass that grows from  high in sandy or gravelly terrain.  It is native to the southern United States southward into Mexico and the Caribbean. It has been introduced elsewhere in the United States and in the Philippines and South Africa.
It is a noxious weed in Europe.

The grass produces a bur, a type of grain fruit, consisting of eight to forty sharp, barbed spines that lodge in clothes, exposed feet, and fur.

Gallery

References

External links

spinifex
Grasses of North America
Flora of the Caribbean
Grasses of Canada
Grasses of Mexico
Grasses of the United States
Grasses of Alabama
Flora without expected TNC conservation status
Taxa named by Antonio José Cavanilles